The selection process for the 1984 Winter Olympics consisted of three bids, and saw Sarajevo, Yugoslavia (in current-day Bosnia and Herzegovina), be selected ahead of Sapporo, Japan, and Gothenburg, Sweden. The selection was made at the 80th International Olympic Committee (IOC) Session in Athens on 18 May 1978.

Results

References

Bids
 
1978 in Greece
20th century in Athens
Events in Athens
May 1978 events in Europe
1978 in Greek sport